Hampstead Synagogue is an Orthodox synagogue in Dennington Park Road, West Hampstead, London, England. The synagogue building, constructed 1892–1901, is Grade II listed with English Heritage.  The synagogue is run under the auspices of the United Synagogue.

The rabbi for this synagogue is Rabbi Dr Michael Harris, the hazzan is Rabbi Shlomo Gerzi, and the administrator is Candice Janet. The rabbi and hazzan lead spiritual services multiple times a week for all who wish to come including regular services every Friday evening and Saturday morning, on festivals, and at other times.  The community also holds learning events, concerts, and social meetings for the members and visitors. The Hampstead Synagogue holds some of the largest seasonal celebrations in the area.

References

External links
Official website
Hampstead | United Synagogue

Synagogues in London
Grade II* listed buildings in the London Borough of Camden
Buildings and structures in Hampstead
20th-century architecture in the United Kingdom
Synagogues completed in 1901
Grade II* listed religious buildings and structures